The Picos de Europa ("Peaks of Europe", also the Picos) are a mountain range extending for about , forming part of the  Cantabrian Mountains in  northern  Spain.
The range is situated in the Autonomous Communities of Asturias, Cantabria and Castile and León.
The highest peak is Torre de Cerredo, at an elevation of  (8,690 ft).

Name
A widely accepted origin for the name is that they were the first sight of Europe for ships arriving from the Americas. The name can be traced to Lucio Marineo Sículo, who mentioned the  Rupes Europae in 1530. Ambrosio Morales, chronist of Felipe II of Spain, mentions the Montañas de Europa in 1572. Prudencio de Sandoval calls them the Peñas o Sierras de Europa in 1601.

Geography
The range consists of three major massifs: Central (also known as Urrieles), Eastern (Ándara) and Western (also known as the Picos de Cornión). The waters in the Cares mostly arise from cave resurgences. Some of the water in the Cares river is diverted through a hydroelectric scheme, with a canal running in the northern wall of the gorge to Camarmeña.

Almost all of the rock in the Picos is limestone, and glacial action has contributed to create an impressive area of alpine karst. Many other peaks reach altitudes of over 2,600 m. The area is popular with mountaineers, climbers and mountain walkers. There is a good network of well-established mountain refuges. The best-known climbing site is the Naranjo de Bulnes or Picu Urriellu, in the Urrieles massif which can be considered the most famous climb in Spain.

Vega de Liordes, an enclave in the León sector of Picos de Europa belonging to the municipality of Posada de Valdeón registered  on January 7, 2021.

Nature
Cantabrian brown bears (Ursus arctos pyrenaicus) and wolves (Canis lupus signatus) live in the more remote regions. Rebeccos (Cantabrian chamois - Rupicapra pyrenaica parva) are fairly frequently seen (according to a 2006 Ministry of the Environment report, there were around 8,000 sightings that year); choughs and buzzards are common, various eagles and vultures are frequently seen, and there is a diverse butterfly population in the park.

Most of the region is now protected as a single Picos de Europa National Park in Cantabria, Asturias and  León provinces of Spain; the Asturian part was Spain's first National Park. Access is via minor roads to each of the three massifs from the north and from the south to the aerial tramway at Fuente Dé and to Caín at the head of the Cares Canyon.

Caves
The Picos de Europa contain many of world's deepest caves, including Torca del Cerro (−1589 m), Sima de la Cornisa (−1507 m), Torca los Rebecos (−1255 m) and Pozo del Madejuno (−1252 m). Discovery of new caves and their exploration still continues.

Gastronomy
The Picos support a dwindling group of shepherds who move up from the valleys in the summer with their sheep, goats, cows, and an occasional pig. The area is famed for its piquant blue cheeses, such as Cabrales cheese and Picón Tresviso Bejes.

Gallery

References

External links
Information about Picos de Europa Mountains spanishminerals.com, Blog of Juan Fernandez Buelga
Safe tours around Picos de Europa Hiking in the park, visit refuges & information.
Spanish tradition, walks and language in the mountains peakme.es
Trekking Picos de Europa topwalks.net
National Park website and online Picos de Europa mountanieering community (Spanish) picoseuropa.net
Picos de Europa at Llanes (Spanish)  llanes.as
Picos de Europa at Valdeon (Spanish)  valdeon.org Ayuntamiento de Posada de Valdeón
Routes in Cantabria and Picos de Europa rutasporcantabria.com,  Bowl Francisco Vega
Picos de Europa: a naturalist's paradise  iberianwildlife.com
Sistema del Hito / Xitu caves oucc.org.uk, Oxford University Cave Club Proceedings 10 : 1980-1981.
El Anillo de Picos - Recorrido circular por los Picos de Europa elanillodepicos.com (Spanish /English) Hiking in the park, routes & information
Tresviso Caves Project caving expeditions to the Eastern Massif

 
Mountain ranges of Castile and León
Mountain ranges of Asturias
Mountain ranges of Cantabria
Cantabrian Mountains
Green Spain